Daniel David Stewart is an American singer and television and theatre actor. He was the Voice of Ernst in the 2015 Broadway revival of Spring Awakening, and he originated the role of Papi in the 2016 world premiere production of The Band's Visit at the Atlantic Theater Company. He played Milo Minderbinder in George Clooney's Catch 22 miniseries for Hulu in 2019 and NASA astronaut Nick Corrado in the Apple TV+ original science fiction space drama series For All Mankind from 2021 to 2022.

Career 
Stewart got his professional start in 2008 in the film Corpse Run. He has also appeared in cameo roles in television shows including Man Up!, The Middle, The Goodwin Games and K.C. Undercover. He has appeared in short and featured length films, including Kids vs Monsters and The Sound of Magic.

In 2014, Stewart appeared in the Deaf West production of the Tony Award-winning musical Spring Awakening as the Voice of Ernst. He then reprised his role for the Broadway revival, and completed his run at Brooks Atkinson Theater on January 24, 2016.

Filmography

Theatre credits

References

External links

American male singers
Living people
Place of birth missing (living people)
Year of birth missing (living people)
American male actors